Hula Mo, Huli Ko is a 2002 Philippine action film directed by Edgardo "Boy" Vinarao. The film stars Rudy Fernandez and Rufa Mae Quinto. It was one of the entries in the 2002 Metro Manila Film Festival.

Cast
 Rudy Fernandez as Randy
 Rufa Mae Quinto as Paula
 Carlos Morales as Dr. Franco
 Mike Gayoso as Jack
 Alvin Anson as Clinton
 Mely Tagasa as Lola Apols
 Gerald Ejercito as Gerry
 Jenine Desiderio as Viola
 Patrick dela Rosa as Brix
 Menggie Cobarrubias as Chief Veloso
 Mar Garchitorena as Remo
 Romy Mallari as Hostage Taker
 Mel Kimura as Hostage Taker's Wife
 Jasmin Reyes as Elena
 Boy Roque as Gary
 Joey Padilla as Arthur
 Arnel Acuba as Afable
 Bon Vibar as Priest
 Albert Zialcita as Pastor
 Robert Rivera as Congressman
 Gemalyn Estrada as Lover Girl
 Nico Quintana as Lover Boy
 Duarte Armea as Roomboy
 Arleen de Leon as De Leon

Production
The film had a working title Uno Corinto. Maricel Soriano at Judy Ann Santos were initially offered to play the leading lady in the film, but respectively turned it down due to scheduling conflicts, with the former busy shooting with fellow entry Mano Po. The role eventually went to Rufa Mae Quinto, as suggested by Bong Revilla.

Accolades

References

External links

2002 films
2002 action films
Filipino-language films
Philippine action films